Forbesiceras is an ammonite that lived during the Cenomanian stage of the Late Cretaceous. Shells are moderately large, reaching diameters of 33 cm (13 in)or so, forming smooth, involute oxycones with narrow or sharp rims and closed umbilici.

References 

 Forbesiceras (in French)
 Mesozoic Ammonoidea; Treatise on Invertebrate Paleontology, Part L. Geol. Soc. of America and Univ. Kansas Press.

Ammonitida genera
Cretaceous ammonites
Fossils of Brazil
Cenomanian life